The Russia We Lost is a 1992 Russian documentary film directed and narrated by Stanislav Govorukhin, dedicated to pre-revolutionary Russia.

Govorukhin worked on the film for a long period, spending much of his time in archives, libraries, and film depositories. In 1991, Stanislav Govorukhin published a book which he called The Russia...we Lost (Россия… Которую мы потеряли), which formed the basis of the script of this film.

Synopsis 
The film contains a large amount of factual information: photos, documents, and newsreels. However, Govorukhin's work is not limited to a statement of facts, but offers his worldview. Standing on the positions of anti-communism, the director largely idealizes tsarist Russia and criticizes Maxim Gorky. Much attention is paid to the personalities of Stolypin, Lenin, Nicholas II.

Perception 
The film had a strong public response and played a significant role in breaking the mass consciousness of the Soviet people in the early 1990s. The phrase "the Russia we have lost" has become a household term for pre-revolutionary Russia, but is also used as a mockery of the idealization of pre-revolutionary Russia.

References 

1992 films
Russian documentary films